Presinger is a surname. Notable people with the surname include:

 Ádám Présinger (born 1989), Hungarian football player
 Agustín Blessing Presinger (1868–1934), German priest, bishop, and missionary

See also
 Preisinger
 Preminger